Allen's big-eared bat (Idionycteris phyllotis) is a species of vesper bat in the monotypic genus Idionycteris.  It occurs in Mexico and in Arizona, California, Nevada, New Mexico, Utah, and Colorado in the United States.

Description
Idionycteris is a bat with large ears, weighing 8 to 16 grams. On the dorsal side they possess long and soft pelage, also referred to as fur. Their fur is basally blackish in color with tips that are a yellow-gray color. Idionycteris, has a black patch on each shoulder, a tuft of white hair on the backside of the ears, as well as, ventral hairs that are black with pale tips. The calcar possesses a low keel. The uropatagium has 12 to 13 transverse ribs. The rostrum is flattened and broad.

Idionycteris phyllotis has an external morphology like that of gleaning bats, which means they have adaptions required for plucking stationary insects from surfaces. To do this, they have long tragi and ears, wings adapted for maneuverability and hovering flight, and a gracile jaw. Allen’s big-eared bat (Idionycteris phyllotis) is the only species in North America known to emit long, constant frequency-frequency modulated echolocation calls.

Range and habitat
The Allen’s big-eared bat inhabits the southwestern mountainous regions of Mexico and the United States. This species, occupies a wider range in elevation, ranging from 855 m to 3,225 m, while most specimens reside at altitudes between 1,100 m and 2,500 m.

References

Vesper bats
Bats of Mexico
Bats of the United States
Bat, Allen
Bat, Allen
Bat, Allen
Bat, Allen
Bat, Allen
Bat, Allen
Mammals described in 1916
Taxa named by Glover Morrill Allen
Taxonomy articles created by Polbot